Michael B. Polk (born 1960/61) is an American businessman, and was the chief executive officer (CEO) of Newell Brands from 2011 until his retirement in 2019.

Polk earned a bachelor's degree in operations research and industrial engineering from Cornell University, where he sang with the Cornell University Glee Club and The Hangovers, and an MBA from Harvard Business School.

In March 2019, Newell Brands announced that Polk would retire at the end of the second quarter.

In June 2019, Chris Peterson, chief financial officer (CFO) was appointed as interim CEO until a permanent CEO is found.

References

Living people
American business executives
Harvard Business School alumni
Cornell University alumni
1960s births